Leon Alton Carlson (February 17, 1895 – September 15, 1961), nicknamed "Swede", was a professional baseball pitcher. He pitched in three games in Major League Baseball for the Washington Senators in 1920, all in relief.

External links

Major League Baseball pitchers
Washington Senators (1901–1960) players
Baseball players from New York (state)
Sportspeople from Jamestown, New York
1895 births
1961 deaths
Little Rock Travelers players